Edmund Henry Pery, 1st Earl of Limerick PC (8 January 1758 – 7 December 1844), styled Lord Glentworth between 1794 and 1800, and Viscount Limerick until 1803, was an Irish peer and politician.

Pery was the son of William Cecil Pery, 1st Baron Glentworth and his first wife, Jane Walcott, daughter of John Minchin Walcott, and educated at Trinity College Dublin. He married Mary Alice, the daughter of Henry Ormsby of County Mayo, by his wife Mary Hartstonge, in 1783, and they had at least eight children. Mary Alice was the heiress of her uncle, Sir Henry Hartstonge, 3rd Baronet, who left her substantial property in the south of Ireland. She died in 1850.

Pery was elected to the Irish Parliament as the Member of Parliament for Limerick in 1786 and held the seat until 1794, when he inherited his father's barony and took his seat in the Irish House of Lords. As a politician, he was a vocal Unionist. He held the office of Keeper of the Signet and Privy Seal of Ireland between 1795 and 1797. In 1797, he was invested as a Privy Counsellor. Pery subsequently held the office of Clerk of the Crown and Hanaper of Ireland between 1797 and 1806. In 1800, he was created Viscount Limerick of the City of Limerick.

Following the Act of Union 1800, he became a representative peer, sitting in the British House of Lords between 1801 and 1844. He was created Earl of Limerick in the Peerage of Ireland on 1 January 1803, in recognition of his vocal and persistent support for the Union. In addition, he was created Baron Foxford of Stackpole Court in the Peerage of the United Kingdom on 11 August 1815, giving him and his descendants a permanent seat in the House of Lords. During this part of his life he lived at South Hill Park, Berkshire, where he died in 1844.

His eldest son and heir, Henry, Viscount Glentworth, had predeceased him in 1834, and thus Limerick was succeeded in his titles by Henry's eldest son, William. One of Pery's daughters, Theodosia, married the Whig politician and Chancellor of the Exchequer, Lord Monteagle of Brandon.

References

|-

|-

1758 births
1844 deaths
Alumni of Trinity College Dublin
Irish MPs 1783–1790
Irish MPs 1790–1797
Irish representative peers
Members of the Privy Council of Ireland
Members of the Irish House of Lords
Members of the Parliament of Ireland (pre-1801) for County Limerick constituencies
1
People from Bracknell
Edmund